Papurana elberti is a species of true frog. It is native to Indonesia and Timor-Leste and found on the islands of Timor and Wetar. The specific name elberti honours Johannes Elbert, a German naturalist who joined an expedition to the Lesser Sunda Islands and Sulawesi in 1910. Common name Lesser Sundas frog has been coined for it.

Taxonomy
Based on molecular data, the previously very diverse genus Hylarana was split in numerous genera in 2015. Molecular data from Papurana elberti was not included in the study, and therefore its placement in Papurana is provisional, pending more morphological and molecular data.

Conservation
Papurana elberti has been assessed by the International Union for Conservation of Nature (IUCN), but the assessment is from 2004 and suggest a broader range than more recent sources.

References

elberti
Fauna of Timor
Amphibians of Indonesia
Amphibians described in 1911
Taxa named by Jean Roux